Ephyra is the second studio album by English band Woman's Hour. It was released on 15 February 2019 through Practice Music.

It is the band's final album before their break-up due to tensions between the band members.

Track listing

References

2019 albums